Étel is a commune in the Morbihan department of Brittany in north-western France. Inhabitants of Étel are called in French Étellois.

See also
Communes of the Morbihan department

References

External links

 Cultural Heritage 
Mayors of Morbihan Association 

Communes of Morbihan